Chaos Compilation is a various artists compilation album released on May 1, 1995, by COP International.

Reception
Black Monday called Chaos Compilation "a most wonderful compilation" and named "Canine" by Tongue as the best song of the year. Sonic Boom called the album "a reasonably conclusive collection of recent caustic coldwave industrial chaos" and "a very strong coldwave industrial compilation albeit heavy on previously signed bands." The album peaked at number six on CMJ New Music Monthly's top dance releases in 1995.

Track listing

Accolades

Personnel
Adapted from the Chaos Compilation liner notes.

 Kim Hansen (as Kim X) – compiling
 Evan Sornstein (Curium Design) – cover art, photography
 Christian Petke (as Count Zero) – compiling
 Stefan Vardopoulos – mastering

Release history

References

External links 
 Chaos Compilation at Discogs (list of releases)

1995 compilation albums
COP International compilation albums